The WTA Tour is the elite tour for professional women's tennis organised by the Women's Tennis Association (WTA). The WTA Tour includes the four Grand Slam tournaments, the WTA Tour Championships and the WTA Tier I, Tier II, Tier III and Tier IV events. ITF tournaments are not part of the WTA Tour, although they award points for the WTA World Ranking.

Schedule 
The table below shows the 1997 WTA Tour schedule.

Key

January

February

March

April

May

June

July

August

September

October

November

Statistical Information 

List of players and titles won, last name alphabetically:
  Martina Hingis – Sydney, Australian Open, Tokyo (Tier I), Paris, Miami, Hilton Head, Wimbledon, Stanford, San Diego, US Open, Filderstadt, Philadelphia (12)
  Lindsay Davenport – Oklahoma City, Indian Wells, Amelia Island, Atlanta, Zurich, Chicago (6)
  Jana Novotná – Madrid, Leipzig, Moscow, Season-Ending Championships (4)
  Iva Majoli – Hanover, Hamburg, French Open (3)
  Monica Seles – Los Angeles, Toronto, Tokyo (Tier II) (3)
  Amanda Coetzer – Budapest, Luxembourg (2)
  Dominique Van Roost – Hobart, Surabaya (2)
  Ruxandra Dragomir – Rosmalen (1)
  Mary Joe Fernandez – Berlin (1)
  Steffi Graf – Strasbourg (1)
  Joannette Kruger – Prague (1)
  Elena Likhovtseva – Hope Island (1)
  Mirjana Lučić – Bol (1)
  Marion Maruska – Auckland (1)
  Henrieta Nagyová – Pattaya (1)
  Barbara Paulus – Warsaw (1)
  Mary Pierce – Rome (1)
  Virginia Ruano Pascual – Cardiff (1)
  Chanda Rubin – Linz (1)
  Naoko Sawamatsu – Jakarta (1)
  Barbara Schett – Maria Lankowitz (1)
  Brenda Schultz-McCarthy – Quebec City (1)
  Ai Sugiyama – Tokyo (Tier III)
  Nathalie Tauziat – Birmingham (1)
  Sandrine Testud – Palermo (1)

The following players won their first title:
  Marion Maruska – Auckland
  Chanda Rubin – Linz
  Ai Sugiyama – Tokyo (Tier III)
  Mirjana Lučić – Bol
  Virginia Ruano Pascual – Cardiff
  Sandrine Testud – Palermo

List of titles won by country:
  Switzerland 12 – Sydney, Australian Open, Tokyo (Tier I), Paris, Miami, Hilton Head, Wimbledon, Stanford, San Diego, US Open, Filderstadt, Philadelphia
  USA 11 – Linz, Oklahoma City, Indian Wells, Amelia Island, Berlin, Los Angeles, Toronto, Atlanta, Tokyo (Tier II), Zurich, Chicago
  Croatia 4 – Hanover, Hamburg, Bol, French Open
  Czech Republic 4 – Madrid, Leipzig, Moscow, Season-Ending Championships
  Austria 3 – Auckland, Warsaw, Maria Lankowitz
  France 3 – Rome, Birmingham, Palermo
  South Africa 3 – Budapest, Prague, Luxembourg
  Belgium 2 – Hobart, Surabaya
  Japan 2 – Tokyo (Tier III), Jakarta
  Germany 1 – Strasbourg
  Russia 1 – Hope Island
  Netherlands 1 – Quebec City
  Romania 1 – Rosmalen
  Slovakia 1 – Pattaya
  Spain 1 – Cardiff

Rankings 
Below are the 1997 WTA year-end rankings in both singles and doubles competition:

See also 
 1997 ATP Tour

References 

 
WTA Tour
1997 WTA Tour